William Brown Meloney may refer to:

 William Brown Meloney (1878–1925), journalist, writer, executive secretary to the New York mayor and historian of shipping
 Marie Mattingly Meloney (1878–1943), journalist and socialite, who used Mrs. William B. Meloney as her professional and social name
 William Brown Meloney (1902–1971), journalist, novelist, short-story writer and theatrical producer